Digitivalva hoenei is a moth of the family Acrolepiidae. It is found in China (Yunnan).

References

Acrolepiidae
Moths described in 1971